Reo is a name appearing on Latin dedications to a Lusitanian-Gallaecian deity, usually with an epithet relating to a place, such as Reo  Paramaeco discovered in Lugo in Galicia. The name Reo is in the Latin dative case, for a Latinized name *Reus.

Name and meaning
Apart from Reo Larauco (Reus of Larouco) the epithets share an -aik- element interpreted as an adjectival marker familiar from Lusitanian inscriptions in  the dedications to Reo Paramaeco (Reus of Paramo) Amoaego Arcunii, Anabaraeco, and Alabaraico Sulensi. The first element Reo/Reus is very similar to the name Reue appearing on the Lusitanian Cabeço das Fráguas inscription, part of which reads INDI TAVROM IFADEM REVE T..., usually interpreted as "and (or thereafter) a fertile(?) bull for Reue" with the epithet lost. Reue therefore also seems to be a dative in the Lusitanian form of the name. Reue appears again on the Ribeira da Venda inscription, including an epithet, as REVE AHARACVI - this time the deity is receiving a sacrifice of ten sheep.

Polish scholar K. T. Witczak derives the name from earlier *diewo, suggesting that the Lusitanian language changed the Proto-Indo European d to r, making Reo a sky deity similar to (and having a name cognate with) the Greek Zeus and Roman Jupiter, something which may be supported by dedications to him near mountains which also allude to Roman Jupiter; however other authorities such as Blázquez and Villar suggest he may have been a deity linked to rivers and that the name derives from a root meaning a flow or current.

See also
 Bull (mythology)

References

Bibliography

Further reading

 
 
 Pedreño, Juan Carlos Olivares. "Los dioses soberanos y los ríos en la religión indígena de la Hispania indoeuropea". In: Gerión n. 18 (2000). pp. 191-212. 
 Prósper, Blanca María; Liébana, Francisco Villar. "Nuevo epígrafe votivo dedicado a la divinidad Reve en La Coruña". In:  Palaeohispánica: Revista sobre lenguas y culturas de la Hispania antigua Nº. 3, 2003, pp. 271-282. .
 Prósper, Blanca María (2010). «REVE ANABARAECO, Divinidad Acuática De Las Burgas (Orense»). In: Palaeohispanica. Revista Sobre Lenguas Y Culturas De La Hispania Antigua, n.º 9 (noviembre), 203-14. https://doi.org/10.36707/palaeohispanica.v0i9.224.
 Redentor, Armando (2013). "Testemunhos De Reve No Ocidente Brácaro". In: Palaeohispanica. Revista Sobre Lenguas Y Culturas De La Hispania Antigua n.º 13 (julio) pp. 219-35. https://ifc.dpz.es/ojs/index.php/palaeohispanica/article/view/162.

Lusitanian gods
Gallaecian gods